The Darussalam Great Mosque is a mosque located in Taliwang, West Sumbawa Regency, West Nusa Tenggara, Indonesia. The mosque was constructed between 2007 and 2010. The shape of the building represents various activities of West Sumbawa's government and society.

Further reading 
  

buildings and structures in West Nusa Tenggara
Mosques in Indonesia
2010 establishments in Indonesia
Mosques completed in 2010